Liping Township (栗坪乡) is a township in Mayang Miao Autonomous County, Hunan, China.

See also 
 List of township-level divisions of Hunan

Townships of Huaihua
Mayang Miao Autonomous County